The Reversed-Field eXperiment (RFX) is the largest reversed field pinch device presently in operation, situated in Padua, Italy. It was constructed from 1985 to 1991, and has been in operation since 1992.

The experiments carried out in the last two decades with two large RFP machines (MST in Madison, Wisconsin and RFX in Padova) provided new insight on the physical phenomena taking place in magnetically confined plasma dynamics.

See also
 List of plasma (physics) articles
 Madison Symmetric Torus

References

External links
 Consorzio RFX website

Magnetic confinement fusion devices
Science and technology in Italy